The Shawarma Shack is a Philippine food franchise known for its "buy one, get one free" shawarma wraps. It started on February 22, 2015, as a nightly ambulant food stand in Divisoria, Manila operated by Walther Uzi Buenavista and Patricia Collantes. As of 2021, it has over 500 outlets and 600 employees throughout the Philippines.

History 
In 2014, 26-year old Walther Uzi Buenavista and his wife Patricia launched a food stand at the Tutuban Center night market in Manila selling shawarma wraps. Walther would make the pita bread while Patricia would help prepare the ingredients and recipe. The business was initially unsuccessful as daily sales were very low. The couple then decided to gradually close down the stand. In order to clear out the inventory, Walther offered a "buy one, get one free" promotion for his wraps. This proved successful for the business and for the first time, their average daily sales went up.

As the business grew, the couple incorporated the promotion as an integral part of their marketing strategy. One of their first expansions was an open air store in SM City North EDSA which they applied for and subsequently rejected 12 times. Most tenants in the area were short-lived except for the Shawarma Shack outlet which became a top seller, impressing the leasing management.

In October 2016, its first store outside Metro Manila was launched at SM City Dasmariñas in Cavite. Its first store in the Visayas was launched in May 2018 at Elizabeth Mall Cebu while its store in Zamboanga City opened in August 2018 was its first in Mindanao. Currently, the business' products are manufactured from a food facility in Quezon City.

The business contracts Daniel Padilla and Kathryn Bernardo as their brand endorsers.

Products 
The franchise mainly offers non-spicy and spicy beef or chicken shawarma wrapped in pita bread. They also serve tikka and kebab wraps and rice meals.

Awards and recognitions 
In 2017, Buenavista was awarded the Millennial Club Award by the Philippines' leading franchise consultancy firm Francorp Philippines which is given in recognition to entrepreneurs who achieved double digit number of branches in less than three years.

In 2022, Buenavista has been awarded “Man of the Year” by the most distributed magazine right now in National Bookstores, Rising Tigers during the Rising Tiger Ball.

The business was also honored by the Philippine Coast Guard and the National Capital Region Police Office for its support during the COVID-19 pandemic.

References 

2014 establishments in the Philippines
Food and drink companies of the Philippines
Food and drink companies established in 2014